Banbury Music Radio was a local Internet radio station in Banbury, Oxfordshire, England that showcased bands from all around Oxfordshire, Berkshire, and other local areas.

History
In November 2007, the station's website gave its address as  BMR, Frampton House, 26 Horse Fair, Banbury, Oxon, OX16 0AE.

By 2010, it had adopted the name Banbury Internet Radio at the Internet domain   In May 2014, the Banbury Internet Radio page said, "Banbury Internet Radio is currently off-air".

In early May 2014, the domain  existed, but the connection to the earlier radio station was not clear.

References

External links

Radio stations in Oxfordshire
Banbury